James Hendrickson Forest (November 2, 1941 – January 13, 2022) was an American writer, Orthodox Christian lay theologian, educator, and peace activist.

Biography
As a young man, Forest served in the US Navy, working with a meteorology unit at the US Weather Bureau headquarters near Washington, DC. It was during this period that he became a Catholic. His military service ended with an early discharge on grounds of conscientious objection.

After leaving the navy, Forest joined the staff of the Catholic Worker community in Manhattan, working close with the founder, Dorothy Day, and for a time served as managing editor of the journal she edited, The Catholic Worker.

In 1964, while working as a journalist for the Staten Island Advance, in his spare time he co-founded the Catholic Peace Fellowship, working closely with Tom Cornell. This became a full-time job for both of them in 1965, a time that coincided with deepening US military engagement in Vietnam. The main focus of their work was counseling conscientious objectors.

In 1968, while Forest worked as Vietnam Program Coordinator of the Fellowship of Reconciliation, Jim and thirteen others, mainly Catholic clergy, broke into nine Milwaukee draft boards, removing and burning some of the files in a nearby park while holding a prayer service. Most members of the "Milwaukee Fourteen" served thirteen months in prison for their action.

In the late sixties and mid-seventies, Forest also worked with the Fellowship of Reconciliation, first as Vietnam Program coordinator and later as editor of Fellowship magazine. From 1977 through 1988, he was Secretary General of the International Fellowship of Reconciliation, work which brought him to the Netherlands. He received the Peacemaker Award from Notre Dame University's Institute for International Peace Studies and the St. Marcellus Award from the Catholic Peace Fellowship.

In 1988, Forest was received into the Eastern Orthodox Church. In 2017, he was ordained as Reader.

Forest had a long-term friendship with Thomas Merton, who dedicated a book to him, Faith and Violence. Jim also accompanied the famed Vietnamese Buddhist monk, Thich Nhat Hanh.

A journalist and writer, Forest's books include Praying with Icons, Ladder of the Beatitudes, The Road to Emmaus: Pilgrimage as a Way of Life, Loving Our Enemies: Reflections on the Hardest Commandment, Eyes of Compassion: Learning from Thich Nhat Hanh, biographies of Thomas Merton (Living With Wisdom), Dorothy Day (All Is Grace) and Daniel Berrigan (At Play in the Lions' Den), and several children's books, including Saint Nicholas and the Nine Gold Coins, Saint George and the Dragon and Silent as a Stone: Mother Maria of Paris and the Trash Can Rescue. He also wrote a memoir, Writing Straight With Crooked Lines.

Forest and his wife Nancy, a translator and writer, lived in Alkmaar, the Netherlands. He died there on January 13, 2022, at the age of 80.

Publications

 Contributions to books by other authors

See also
 List of peace activists

Citations

Sources

External links 
 
 A Short Biography of Jim Forest
 Getting From There to Here (autobiographical essay)
 orthodoxwiki.org

1941 births
2022 deaths
American Christian pacifists
American conscientious objectors
Catholic Workers
Converts to Eastern Orthodoxy from Roman Catholicism
Eastern Orthodox theologians
Lay theologians
Military personnel from Salt Lake City
Nonviolence advocates
People from Alkmaar
Russian Orthodox Christians from the United States
Writers from Salt Lake City